Yulu may refer to the following.

People 
 Yulu people
 Tuoba Yulü
 Jiao Yulu
 Bai Yulu
 Christian Yulu
 Jeanvion Yulu-Matondo
 Du Yulu
 Chen Yulu
 Yulü, one of the Chinese door gods

Transportation 

 Yulu, a transportation company
 Yulu, or Yu Lu, a Chinese automotive company
 Yulu EV2, a vehicle

Other 

 Yulu language
 Yulu (裕禄) the Viceroy of Liangjiang in 1884 and 1887
 Yulu, a national reserve in Nicaragua
 Jiao Yulu, a film